WΔZ (pronounced double-u delta zed) is a 2007 British crime horror thriller film directed by Tom Shankland and starring Stellan Skarsgård, Melissa George, Selma Blair and Tom Hardy. The film was released in the United States with the title The Killing Gene.

Plot

A pair of detectives attempt to solve a series of grisly murders in a dark rain soaked New York in which each victim has the Price equation (wΔz = Cov (w,z) = βwzVz) carved into their chests .

Detective Eddie Argo (Skarsgard) and his new partner Helen Westcott (George) decipher the strange equation and realize each victim must make a heinous choice: kill your loved ones or be killed. Soon, it is clear the perpetrator has suffered a similar fate and is now coping by attempting to solve this philosophical quandary.

Cast

 Stellan Skarsgård as Eddie Argo
 Melissa George as Helen Westcott
 Selma Blair as Jean Lerner
 Tom Hardy as Pierre Jackson
 Ashley Walters as Daniel Leone
 Paul Kaye as Gelb
 Michael Wildman as O'Hare
 Sally Hawkins as Elly Carpenter
 Michael Liebman as Wesley Smith
 John Sharian as Jack Corelli
 Alibe Parsons as Miss Allaway
 Sean Brian Chipango as Jamal Osman / Khaled Osman
 Barbara Adair as Alice Jackson
 Lauren Hood as Sharon Williams
 Sheila Kerr as Alison Lerner
 Joshua O'Gorman as Dominic Carpenter
 Robert Phillips as Captain Maclean
 Marcus Valentine as Hassan Harbi
 Peter Ballance as Trucker
 Igor Smiljevic as SWAT leader
 Larry Cowan as Junkie
 Laurence Doherty as NY Detective
 Roy McManus as Paramedic

Release and reception
The film received generally positive reviews. Review aggregation website Rotten Tomatoes gives the film a score of 71% based on reviews from 14 critics.

CHUD.com wrote of the film, "Director Tom Shankland paints a grimy portrait that fits well with the Clive Bradley script. It is a great debut for both filmmakers who created a movie that works on almost every level."

DVD Talk wrote, "But let's not kid ourselves: This is a nasty horror thriller that has a Class of 1984 feel to it, although it has the most in common with the Saw series (even the line "Oh yes, there will be blood!" is morphed into "But there will be pain!"). It's not quite as outlandishly brutal, but it's still mean."

Fortean Times wrote, "While the plot twists rarely come as a surprise, the film's grimy feel and effective pacing, and a gripping – if occasionally rather over-exaggerated – central performance by Skarsgård, make this a genuinely thrilling venture into Se7en territory, despite the unfortunate silliness of the title."

See also
 Price equation
 Social commentary
 Psychological torture
 Modus operandi

References

External links
 
 
 

2007 films
2007 horror films
2007 crime thriller films
2000s horror thriller films
2000s psychological horror films
2007 psychological thriller films
2000s serial killer films
British crime thriller films
British horror thriller films
British psychological films
British serial killer films
Police detective films
Vertigo Films films
Torture in films
Films scored by David Julyan
2000s English-language films
2000s British films